Vida is the tenth studio album by Puerto Rican singer Luis Fonsi, released on February 1, 2019, through Universal Music Latin Entertainment. It is Fonsi's first album in five years, and features the singles "Despacito" (both the original version and remix), "Échame la Culpa", "Calypso" (both the original version and remix), "Imposible" and "Sola".

Music
Along with its singles, the primarily Spanish album includes "Sola", which was described as a "mid-tempo, sultry R&B tinged jam over sparse arrangements" by Billboard. It includes a variety of tempos, ranging from the "up-tempo urban/pop fusions" "Despacito" and "Échame la Culpa" to the romantic ballad "Le pido al cielo". Billboard named Vida one of the most anticipated albums of 2019, saying there would be "plenty of new ballads, which Fonsi sings predominantly in Spanish and delivers with an urban touch".

Critical reception
Vida received a nomination for Best Latin Pop Album at the 62nd Annual Grammy Awards.

Commercial performance
In the United States, Vida debuted at number 18 on the US Billboard 200 with 22,000 equivalent album units and at number one on the Top Latin Albums chart and on the Latin Pop Albums chart.

Track listing
Adapted from iTunes.

Charts

Weekly charts

Year-end charts

Certifications

References

2019 albums
Luis Fonsi albums
Universal Music Latino albums